The 21st CARIFTA Games was held in Nassau, Bahamas, on April 18–20, 1992.

Participation (unofficial)

Detailed result lists can be found on the "World Junior Athletics History" website.  An unofficial count yields the number of about 236 athletes (141 junior (under-20) and 95 youth (under-17)) from about 19 countries:  Antigua and Barbuda (2), Bahamas (51), Barbados (19), Belize (2), Bermuda (15), British Virgin Islands (4), Cayman Islands (10), Dominica (4), French Guiana (2), Grenada (6), Guadeloupe (20), Guyana (3), Jamaica (58), Martinique (7), Saint Kitts and Nevis (4), Saint Lucia (11), Suriname (1), Trinidad and Tobago (16), Turks and Caicos Islands (1).

Austin Sealy Award

The Austin Sealy Trophy for the most outstanding athlete of the games was awarded to Claudine Williams from Jamaica.  She won 2 gold medals (400m, and 800m) in the youth
(U-17) category, and a further gold medal in the 4 × 400m relay in the junior
(U-20) category.

Medal summary
Medal winners are published by category: Boys under 20 (Junior), Girls under 20 (Junior), Boys under 17 (Youth). and Girls under 17 (Youth).
Complete results can be found on the "World Junior Athletics History" website.

Boys under 20 (Junior)

Girls under 20 (Junior)

Boys under 17 (Youth)

Girls under 17 (Youth)

Medal table (unofficial)

References

External links
World Junior Athletics History

CARIFTA Games
International athletics competitions hosted by the Bahamas
CARIFTA Games
CARIFTA
CARIFTA Games